Bankipur is a neighbourhood and residential area in Patna, in the Indian state of Bihar. It is located on the bank of the river Ganges. The prime attraction is the Khuda Bakhsh Oriental Library built by Khan Bahadur Khuda Bakhsh in 1891 and Golghar granary that was built by Captain John Garstin in 1786. Patna Dental College and Hospital is also located here.

History
Until the early twentieth century, Bankipore (or Bankipur, or Banki Bazaar) was the administrative centre of the Patna Division of Bihar, which came under the rule of the British East India Company (EIC) following the battle of Buxar in 1764. Bankipore lies along an east–west axis on the south bank of the Ganges, some four kilometers west from the medieval Patna City, or Azimabad.

The site is almost certainly the location of the ancient Magadhan and Maurya capital of Pataliputra. Its identification with Pataliputra was first noticed by Sir William Jones who was informed that Bankipore lay on the former confluence of the River Sone with the Ganges, a site that has shifted some distance upstream now-and one that matches Megasthenes' description.

In 1774 the EIC ceded Banki Bazaar to the Austrian Ostend Company.

Among the principal remains of the colonial period in Bankipore are the District Collectorate, the Civil Court, and mansions such as the impressive Darbhanga House (now the PG Deptt.Patna University, Patna), built in the late 19th century by the great philanthropist, the Maharaja of Darbhanga, Lachmaneshwar Singh. The Bankipore cemetery, which has the graves of minor Company officials and indigo planters, the Khuda Bakhsh Oriental Public Library, founded by Khan Bahadur Khuda Bakhsh in 1891, and the Catholic Mission, are among the other historic sites of Bankipore. Bankipore is also notable for its several ghats, which include the old Jahaz Ghat, from where plied the daily ferry across the river, and the Darbhanga Ghat.

One of the earliest educational institutions of the erstwhile Bengal Presidency, Rammohun Roy Seminary, a High English School, was set up at Bankipur in 1892 under the charge of Satis Chandra Chakravarti, a worker of the Bankipur Ashram of the Sadharan Brahmo Samaj.

In 1912, Indian National Congress held its 27th session at Bankipore under the Presidency of Rao Bahadur Raghunath Narasinha Mudholkar from Amravati of Central Provinces and Berar.

The name of this place goes to Islamic invader Mir Banki who attacked Bengal in 15th century and came to Patna in his campaign.

In fiction
The author E. M. Forster states that the city of Chandrapore, in his novel A Passage to India (1924), "was suggested geographically by the town of Bankipore". The Marabar Hills of the novel corresponds to the Rajgir hills, a few miles away from Patna and the site of ancient Buddhist-Mauryan remains.

References

Neighbourhoods in Patna